Crush is the third extended play by American singer and songwriter Ravyn Lenae. It was released on February 9, 2018.

Background
The EP is entirely produced by Steve Lacy, and includes vocals from him. Ravyn Lenae described the EP as a coming-of-age project and said "the melodies are different, just my approach to certain topics are more blunt, and that’s a matter of the sound that’s changed, and also me being older. I don’t have to hide certain things anymore in my music. I’m feeling a little more confident in who I am and my experiences."

Singles and promotion
On December 8, 2017, she released “Sticky” as the first single for this EP. On January 23, the music video was released. To further promote the single, she appeared on MTV's Total Request Live and performed the track. A second single, "4 Leaf Clover", as well as a visual, were released on April 24.

Track listing

References

Contemporary R&B EPs
Neo soul EPs
Albums produced by Steve Lacy
2018 EPs
Ravyn Lenae albums